Guéoul is a town and rural commune in the Louga Region of Senegal.

According to PEPAM (Programme d'eau potable et d'assainissement du Millénaire), the commune has a population of 10,918 people living in 1050 houses.

The section of the railway line Dakar-Saint-Louis and Louga between Guéoul (20 km) was opened for operation on 1 January 1885, followed by the section between Guéoul and Kébémer (17 km) in March of the same year.

Binet Diop, a women's rights activist, was born in Guéoul.

References

Populated places in Louga Region
Communes of Senegal